Margarita Yelisseyeva (born 20 July 1992) is a Kazakh weightlifter. She earned a gold medal at the 2014 Asian Games in the women's 48 kg class in Incheon. She attends Kazakh Academy of Sport and Tourism.

References

1992 births
Kazakhstani female weightlifters
Asian Games medalists in weightlifting
Weightlifters at the 2014 Asian Games
Living people
Weightlifters at the 2016 Summer Olympics
Olympic weightlifters of Kazakhstan
Asian Games gold medalists for Kazakhstan
Medalists at the 2014 Asian Games
21st-century Kazakhstani women